Leo Mittler (18 December 1893 – 16 May 1958) was an Austrian playwright, screenwriter and film director. Mittler was born in Vienna, then the capital of the Austro-Hungarian Empire, to a Jewish family. He attended the University of Music and Performing Arts and worked as a playwright and director in the German theatre. Mittler then switched to work in the booming German film industry during the silent era.

Mittler's best known film as director was Beyond the Street (1929), a "street film" influenced by Soviet cinema. As well as his work in the German industry, Mittler also spent time at the American company Paramount's French language-subsidiary based at the Joinville Studios in Paris.

Following the Nazi rise to power in 1933, Mittler spent many years in exile in several countries including Britain and France before settling in the United States during the Second World War. Mittler's career as a director had all but ended in the mid-1930s, after making the Stanley Lupino musical comedy Cheer Up (1936), but he worked occasionally as a screenwriter.

Mittler wrote the original story of the MGM pro-Soviet film Song of Russia (1944) which was later investigated by HUAC for its alleged communist sympathies. Mittler returned to Germany post-war, and died there in 1958. Before his death, he worked for German theatre and television.

Selected filmography

Director
 We'll Meet Again in the Heimat (1926)
 Serenissimus and the Last Virgin (1928)
 Beyond the Street (1929)
 There Is a Woman Who Never Forgets You (1930)
 The King of Paris (1930, German)
 The King of Paris (1930, French)
 Tropical Nights (1931)
 The Incorrigible (1931)
 The Concert (1931)
 Sunday of Life (1931)
 Every Woman Has Something (1931)
 Reckless Youth (1931)
 The Leap into the Void (1932)
 The Night at the Hotel (1932)
 Nights in Port Said (1932)
 The Faceless Voice (1933)
 Honeymoon for Three (1935)
 The Last Waltz (1936)
 Cheer Up (1936)

Screenwriter
 Sixteen Daughters and No Father (1928)
 The Ghost Ship (1943)
 Song of Russia (1944)

References

Bibliography
 Mayhew, Robert. Ayn Rand And Song Of Russia: Communism And Anti-Communism in 1940s Hollywood. Scarecrow Press, 2005.
 Prawer, S.S. Between Two Worlds: The Jewish Presence in German and Austrian Film, 1910-1933. Berghahn Books, 2005.

External links

1893 births
1958 deaths
Jewish emigrants from Austria to the United States after the Anschluss
Austrian male dramatists and playwrights
Austrian film directors
Austrian television directors
Film people from Vienna
Austrian male screenwriters
20th-century Austrian dramatists and playwrights
20th-century Austrian male writers
20th-century Austrian screenwriters